Woroniec  is a village in the administrative district of Gmina Biała Podlaska, within Biała Podlaska County, Lublin Voivodeship, in eastern Poland.

The village has an approximate population of 420.

Near the village was built a monument in memory of the fallen American pilots in World War II. The monument was erected at the site of Boeing B-17 plane crash in 1944 year.

References

Villages in Biała Podlaska County